was a one-shot Hello! Project group, similar to the Hello! Project shuffle units, that released one single called "Shall We Love?".

The formation of Gomattō was announced in October 2002. The idea behind the trio was an R&B style dance-based group featuring Hello! Project soloists Maki Goto, Aya Matsuura and Miki Fujimoto, and was both conceived and named by producer Tsunku. Maki Goto functioned as the leader of the group. Gomattō made their first television appearance in November, and later released their first (and only) single called "Shall We Love?" on November 20, 2002. On December 11, 2002, Goto and Fujimoto performed with Yuko Nakazawa, a fellow member of Hello! Project, as a one-off performance. This incarnation of the group was called "Gonattō" (replacing the "ma" of "Matsuura" with the "na" of "Nakazawa").

All three members later recorded solo versions of the song, all with different arrangements. Miki Fujimoto's version was a more down-tempo soul inspired version, and both Maki Goto and Aya Matsuura's versions were—like the original version—inspired by the productions of Kevin "She'kspere" Briggs. The single was also featured on the 2008 compilation album "Hello! Project Special Units Mega Best".

Goto and Matsuura would later work together with Natsumi Abe in the one-off unit Nochiura Natsumi, which later morphed into Def.Diva with the addition of v-u-den's Rika Ishikawa. Fujimoto joined Morning Musume (Goto's former group) and also became a supplementary member of Country Musume. In June 2006, it was announced that Fujimoto and Matsuura would form a new duo, GAM, and their first single was released in September of the same year (though they released only 3 singles before becoming inactive after March 2007).

All three members graduated from Hello! Project in March 2009 with the rest of the Elder Club.

Discography

Singles

DVD

External links 
 Official Up-Front Works Discography Entry 

Japanese girl groups
Japanese idol groups
Japanese pop music groups
Hello! Project groups
Japanese musical trios
Musical groups from Tokyo